2008 Egypt Cup Final, was the final match of 2007–08 Egypt Cup, when Zamalek played ENPPI at Cairo Stadium in Cairo.

Zamalek won the game 2–1, claiming the cup for the 21st time.

Route to the final

Game description

Match details

References
 http://www.angelfire.com/ak/EgyptianSports/Zamalekcup0708.html
 http://www.footballdatabase.eu/football.coupe.zamalek.enppi.108301.en.html

2008
Cup Final
EC 2008
EC 2008